Air Timor (Air Timor S.A.) is a travel company based in Dili, East Timor (Timor-Leste). It operates as an airline, and as of October 2019 it provided services from Dili to Kupang under a charter arrangement with TransNusa, and to Singapore under a charter arrangement with Drukair. As of October 2019 it has no aircraft under its own registry. The airline has been said to have a defined strategy to become East Timor’s international and domestic airline.

The airline is registered as a public stock holding company in East Timor and has numerous domestic public investors. The Board of Directors comprises three Timorese representatives, including the Chairman. The head office of Air Timor is located at Dili International Airport, while an administrative and operational office has been established at Changi International Airport. 

Air Timor Australia Pty. Ltd. is no longer affiliated with the Singaporean and Timorese Companies since breaking off in 2017. The Australian Company also holds an Australian AOC (Air Operators Certificate) issued by CASA (being the Australian Civil Aviation Authority).

History
Prior to operating in Timor-Leste, Air Timor first commenced its corporate life as charter airline under the name Austasia Airlines, operating charters between Australia and Indonesia from 2001 until 2007. In 2007 it relocated to East Timor, and Austasia Airlines was registered there as well as in Singapore. Following approval from the Timorese Government, Austasia Airlines commenced its first scheduled charter flights from Singapore to Dili in August 2008, operating a twice weekly schedule on Tuesday and Saturday with an Airbus A319 aircraft wet-leased from SilkAir

In 2010 Austasia Airlines lodged its application to become a national company and change its name to Air Timor S. A., which was approved by the East Timor government.

In October 2014 the airline commenced operations from Bali, Indonesia direct to Dili, under another charter operation.

On March 30 2019, Air Timor made their last flight from Dili (DIL) to Singapore (SIN). On June 14, 2019, Air Timor resumed its Dili to Kupang flights, a joint service with Transnusa. Currently it operates a thrice weekly flight to Kupang using the ATR 72-600.

On October 17 2019, Air Timor announced the resumption of the Dili-Singapore route starting October 31 2019, on an Airbus A319 operated by Drukair. The route will be flown twice weekly, on Thursdays and Sundays.

Destinations

Fleet
Air Timor does not currently operate nor own any aircraft under its own registry.

See also
 List of airlines of East Timor

References

External links
 Air Timor Cessna 208
 Air Timor Official Website

Airlines of East Timor
Airlines established in 2007
2007 establishments in Asia
Dili